Michel Dumont  (29 January 1941 – 13 August 2020) was a Canadian actor. He served as the artistic director for the Théâtre Jean-Duceppe in Montreal from 1991 to 2018.

Filmography
Picotine (1972-1975)
Du tac au tac (1976)
Race de monde (1978-1981)
Chocolate Eclair (1979)
Frédéric (1980)
Monsieur le ministre (1982-1986)
Laurier (1984)
Des dames de cœur (1986-1989)
Cargo (1990)
Marilyn (1991)
Les Grands Procès (1994)
Urgence (1996)
Omerta (1996)
Omerta 2: The Law of Silence (1997)
La Part des anges (1998)
Rue l'Espérance (1999)
Laura Cadieux II (1999)
L'Or (2001)
Bunker, le cirque (2002)
24 poses (2002)
Without Her (2005)
Northern Mysteries (2006)
Un homme mort (2006)
L'amour aller-retour (2009)
Yamasaka (2009)
Café de Flore (2011)
Omertà (2012)
Le Garagiste (2015)
Victor Lessard (2017)

Distinctions
Prix Gémeaux for Best Male Lead, Omerta 2: The Law of Silence (1998)
Prix Gémeaux for Best Male Lead, Bunker, le cirque (2003)
Officer of the National Order of Quebec (2013)

References

External links

 

1941 births
2020 deaths
20th-century Canadian male actors
21st-century Canadian male actors
Canadian artistic directors
Canadian male film actors
Canadian male stage actors
Canadian male television actors
Deaths from lung cancer
Male actors from Quebec
People from Saguenay, Quebec
Place of death missing
French Quebecers